Judith Carter Lowry (née Ives; July 27, 1890 – November 29, 1976) was an American actress. She had nearly 30 film and television roles and appeared on stage, most notably in the Off-Broadway production of The Effect of Gamma Rays on Man-in-the-Moon Marigolds and on Broadway in Archibald MacLeish's J.B. She became well-known for her role as Mother Dexter on  the CBS show Phyllis during the last year of her life, but died midway through the show's second season.

Early life
Judith Carter Ives was born at Fort Sill, Oklahoma, where her father was temporarily stationed. She was the daughter of Mildred Elizabeth Megeath (July 17, 1864 – 1923) and Francis Joseph Ives (July 19, 1857 – November 27, 1908). Her father was a career surgeon in the U.S. Army, attaining the rank of Major.

Her father saw action in the Spanish–American War, serving initially in Cuba and later in the Philippines, before retiring to Washington, D.C. in 1908, where he died. Through her father, Lowry was a descendant of American Revolutionary War soldier Asahel Ives.

Career
Lowry made her stage debut in 1913 in a stock company in Washington, D.C. In 1921, she gave birth to her first child and retired from acting to raise her family. She resumed her acting career in 1952 after the youngest of nine children turned 18, appearing on stage and taking occasional bit parts in film and television. It was not until her eighties that she began to receive more substantial roles. Lowry played an uncredited part in Valley of the Dolls (1967) as Aunt Amy, followed by roles in such films as The Anderson Tapes and Cold Turkey.

Her best-remembered role is that of acid-tongued, no-nonsense Mother Dexter on the 1970s sitcom Phyllis, starring Cloris Leachman. This was Lowry's last major acting role. She died of a heart attack during the series' final season. One of the last episodes she filmed before her death, "Mother Dexter's Wedding", marked the final appearance of veteran actor Burt Mustin, who played her bridegroom, Arthur Lanson. By the time the episode aired in December 1976, Lowry had died at age 86, and the 92-year-old Mustin, who died in January 1977, was too ill to see it. After the airing of "Mother Dexter's Wedding", five more episodes of Phyllis followed in which Lowry appeared.

Family
Judith met her husband, actor Rudd Lowry, while performing on stage. Rudd had recently returned from serving in the U.S. Army during World War I as a Staff sergeant in an army hospital. The couple had six sons and three daughters. All their sons served with the United States Armed Forces.

Filmography

Selected films

Television

Death
Lowry collapsed and died from a heart attack while walking down a Greenwich Village street with her son Rayphield Semmes Lowry, on November 29, 1976; she was 86 years old. She was buried next to her husband, Rudd Lowry, in Long Island National Cemetery, Farmingdale, New York.

References

External links
 
 
 
 

1890 births
1976 deaths
20th-century American actresses
Actresses from Washington, D.C.
American film actresses
American stage actresses
American television actresses
People from Fort Sill, Oklahoma